Rolf Hansen may refer to:

 Rolf Hansen (athlete) (1906–1980), Norwegian long-distance runner
 Rolf Hansen (director) (1904–1990), German film director
 Rolf Arthur Hansen (1920–2006), Norwegian politician
 Rolf Willy Hansen (born 1949), Norwegian diplomat
 Rolf Bloch Hansen (1894–1981), Norwegian military officer and skiing official
 Rolf Morgan Hansen (born 1961), Norwegian Olympic cyclist